Peter van Tour (born 1966) is a Dutch musicologist, music historian and music theorist, specializing in Aural Training, Counterpoint and Historical Improvisation. He is best known as an expert in the field of Partimento and is the author of "Counterpoint and Partimento: Methods of Teaching Composition in Late Eighteenth-Century Naples", his doctoral dissertation. Van Tour is an associate professor of Music Theory and Musical Analysis at Örebro University in Sweden.

Education
Van Tour has Masters Degrees in Music Pedagogy (Brabant Conservatory, 1988), Musicology (Utrecht University, 1990) and Music Theory (Royal College of Music, Stockholm, 2008). In 2015, van Tour received his PhD in Musicology and Music Theory from Uppsala University, with his dissertation "Counterpoint and Partimento: Methods of Teaching Composition in Late Eighteenth-Century Naples" winning the Hilding Rosenberg Award for Musicology.

Research on Counterpoint and Partimento
Van Tour's research has helped identify two different schools of counterpoint instruction among the music conservatories of Naples in the 18th century. These are the school of Leonardo Leo, which emphasized adding counterpoint above or below a cantus firmus and the school of Francesco Durante, which emphasized writing counterpoint above a bass line.

Awards
 Hilding Rosenberg Award of Musicology (2016) - Counterpoint and Partimento: Methods of Teaching Composition in Late Eighteenth-Century Naples

Books

Notes

References

External links
 Peter van Tour Personal Page.
 Peter van Tour Faculty Page at the Norwegian Academy of Music

Dutch music theorists
20th-century musicologists
21st-century musicologists
1966 births
Living people